Sri Gurusar Modia is a village in the Indian state of Rajasthan situated near borders of Rajasthan, Haryana and Punjab states and the international border of India and Pakistan. This village is located in the tehsil Suratgarh of district Sriganganagar. Suratgarh, once known as Sodhal was believed to be surrounded by the confluence of Saraswati and Drishyati rivers but now the land is a deserted one lying amidst the expanse of The great Indian Thar desert. Suratgarh is famous for its agriculture, air force and army base stations, largest thermal power plant of Rajasthan and largest radio station of Rajasthan called as "Cotton City Channel". Sri Gurusar Modia came into limelight when a controversial self-proclaimed saint and spiritual leader Gurmeet Ram Rahim Singh (who later on convicted for various crimes) was believed to be incarnated there and crowned to the throne of Dera Sacha Sauda at Sirsa in 1991. With setting up of Shah Satnam Schools for both boys and girls, super speciality hospitals etc. this village became nationwide popular

Religion
Most people practice the Hindu and Sikh religions. People worship folk gods such as Ramdevji and Gogaji. Many have faith in Dera Sacha Sauda and they visit their  (shrines). Some practise Islam. Some follow other practices such as Radha-Soami and Nirankari deras.

Location and area
Sri Gurusar Modia
Sri Ganganagar District is located between Latitude 28.4 to 30.6 and Longitude 72.2 to 75.3 The total area of Sri Ganganagar is 11,154.66 km2 or 1,115,466 hectares. It is surrounded on the east by Hanumangarh District, (Hanumangarh district was carved out of it on 12 July 1994) on the south by Bikaner District, and on the west by Bahawalnagar district of the Pakistani Punjab and on the north by the Punjab.

By Air
Nearest airports are Sriganganagar (Lalgarh Jatan) 40 km and Bikaner (Nal) 220 km.  Well connected from Jaipur and Delhi via air route.
 The Sri Ganganagar city is well connected with major cities through both rail and road transport
 A metro rail project is also likely to be initiated in the near future. But no such projects have been planned so far.

By Rail
Sri Ganganagar is well connected by railways to Delhi 424, Rewari 427, Kalka 397, Howrah 1980, Bathinda 127, Haridwar 485, Nanded 1963, Firozpur 184 Suratgarh 40 km etc.
Track between Sri Ganganagar and Hanumangarh 67 km is being converted into broad gauge.  This work will get completed in March 2013. and the train will starts in May 2013. This track will connect Sri Ganganagar To Bikaner, Jodhpur, Jaipur, Ahmedabad, Surat, Mumbai and the progress in train services will be affect the population of District headquarters very soon. Yard remodeling and Washing line, sick line and washable apron are main work and a new Electric sub station has been constructed near . As per September 2018 this track laying work has been completed.

By Road
National Highway No-15 is running from Sriganganagar to Sanchore, which is well linked with all the major areas of Sriganganagar. Now it's renamed as NH-62 and runs from Sriganganagar to Jaisalmer. Many roadways and private buses are frequently available to major cities of north India like Delhi 431 km, Jaipur 501 km, Ajmer, Udaipur, Chandigarh, Jalandhar, Jodhpur 650 km, Kota, Haryana, Punjab.
It is well connected to Mumbai 1472 km by road.

Climate
The climate of Sri Gurusar Modia varies to extreme limits. Summer temperature reaches 50° Celsius and winter temperature dips just around 0° Celsius. The average annual rainfall is only . Average maximum temperature in summer is 41.2 °C and average minimum temperature in winter is 6 °C. The Canal MOD.(Modia) Flow in the south of village. After this Village it divided in two minors near 32Mod are MOD & DBN (Dhaban). The HDP (Hardyalpura) Minor also Flow into Mod before gurusar modia village.

Education

The village has been a center of learning since its early ages. This city has a large proportion of land which is dedicated to educational institutes. Notable educational institutions from the city include:
Govt. Sen. Sec. School
Shah Satnam Ji Boy School
Shah Satnam Ji Girls School
Shah satnam ji Girls College
B.M.B. Public School

Colleges
Shah Satnam Ji Girls College

Languages
The main languages in the area are Bagri a dialect of Rajasthani, Punjabi and Hindi as well. Majority of people in the district speaks Bagri, Punjabi. Hindi and English are official languages.
The Punjabi language, as an optional subject, is taught in schools and colleges of the city. Punjabi music is very popular in the Sri Ganganagar.  The impact of the Saraiki dialect can be observed in Arora, Raisikhs and Saraiki Muslim communities. Now this dialect, Saraiki is losing ground in the northern part of the district. Bagri is spoken only in Ganganagar and Hanumangarh districts and in some tehsils of neighbouring Punjab and Haryana. A number of writers of the district have made contributions to Rajasthani literature, through Bagri.

Culture
 Punjabi and Bagri cultures dominate the district.
The embroidered Odhni (mostly red in colour) is a symbol of Bagri women. A long shirt and ghaghro (long frock type clothes) and borlo (a head ornament) is the traditional dress of Bagri women.

Punjabi women wear a suit and salwar with chunni (cloth on head). This attire has also become popular with women of other communities. Some women of the Hindu and Muslim Seraiki people still wear  (long frock).

The Purdah (or veil) is mainly in vogue among Bagri women. Men mainly wear a pant-shirt, kurta-payjama and dhoti (Punjabis call it the chadara-kurta).§

Traditional Sikh and Rajasthani devotional music is popular. Bollywood songs are listened to with same enthusiasm as in other northern Indian regions.

References

Villages in Sri Ganganagar district